Phaenopharos is a genus of phasmids belonging to the family Lonchodidae.

Species:
Phaenopharos herwaardeni 
Phaenopharos khaoyaiensis 
Phaenopharos struthioneus

References

Lonchodidae
Insects described in 1904
Taxa named by William Forsell Kirby